Khanda is a historical village in Sonipat district of Haryana, India. It is a part of the Delhi NCR. Khanda has two Gram Panchayats Khanda Khas & Khanda Alman. Two Sarpanchs elects from the village in every five years. Khanda is the head of 12 villages of Dahiya Khap mainly known as (Khanda Baraha).

History

In 1709, Banda Singh Bahadur came here and raised his army and set up his first army headquarters with the help of villagers from Khanda, Sonipat to attack Mughal treasury and to free Punjab from tyranny of Mughals after getting blessings of Guru Gobind Singh. He defeated Mughals in the Battle of Sonipat and conquered it. Thereafter, he would go on to kill Mughal Governor (equivalent to chief minister) of Punjab, the richest and most powerful province of the Mughal Empire, inflicting biggest defeats to the Mughals, 17th century World super power, in their history. Khanda, Sonipat village witnessed the Battle of Sonipat against Mughals and won the battle under the military leadership of Banda Singh Bahadur Khanda is most powerful village. Many history books says that Khanda was named after the Mahabharata times Khandava Forest or Khandavaprastha. One of the oldest Nirmohi Akhara math is located at Khanda village Kishore Das was the first Mahant of this math.

Battle of Sonipat
The one and only battle fought in Sonipat was Battle of Sonipat. After taking blessings from Guru Gobind Singh, Baba Banda Singh Bahadur first camped at Khanda, Sonipat and assembled a fighting force with Dahiya Jats. Khanda, Sonipat village witnessed the Battle of Sonipat against Mughals and won the battle under the military leadership of Banda Singh Bahadur.

Infrastructure

There are two government and four private or Independent schools  and one college in the village. Government of Haryana acquired 50 acres land in Khanda for Haryana's first Armed Forces Preparatory Institute. Nasirpur Cholka is said to be the capital of Khanda. On 3 November 2018 , Chief Minister Manohar Lal Khattar  inaugurated the Armed Forces Prepratory Institute and Banda Singh Bahadur memorial. This institute will provide training to selected boys from the state for commission in armed forces through National Defence Academy (India), Indian Military Academy and Officers Training Academy. CM also announce to open a Govt. Clinic it will also benefit to nearby villages.

Khanda village is 8 km far away from Maruti Suzuki manufacturing plant across 900 acre in IMT Kharkhoda. Property prices hike in Khanda village due to Maruti Suzuki new manufacturing unit in Kharkhoda.

Connectivity
The village lies on Major District Road that connects many villages. It is 4 km away from National Highway 334B (India) and State Highway 18. It is 8 km away from 
National Highway 344P (India) and Western Peripheral Expressway (KMP) and It is 9 km away from Delhi–Amritsar–Katra Expressway and 22 km away from National Highway 44 (India) AH1 & AH2 also known as GT Road Grand Trunk Road.

The nearby airport is Indira Gandhi International Airport and nearby railway station is Sonipat Junction railway station. Nearby holy river is Yamuna and nearby major canal is Western Yamuna Canal. NCR channel and the Reliance canal flows from the village.

Notable people

 Vinod Kumar Dahiya Wrestler
 Rohit Dahiya Cricketer
 Padam Singh Dahiya Leader
 Vivek Dahiya Actor
 Deep Chand Bahman Saang Artist

See also 

 Kharkhoda, Haryana
 Sonipat
 Battle of Sonipat
 Khandava Forest
 Banda Singh Bahadur
 Bharata Khanda
 Khandavaprastha
 Swarnprastha
 Sehri, India

References 

Villages in Sonipat district